Mannetjies de Goede is a South African Army officer, who served as Acting Chief of the Army.

In June 2012 he was promoted to brigadier general and appointed Director Area Defence at the South African Army Infantry Formation.

References

Living people
South African Army generals
Year of birth missing (living people)